PK/PD modeling (pharmacokinetic/pharmacodynamic modeling) (alternatively abbreviated as PKPD or PK-PD modeling) is a technique that combines the two classical pharmacologic disciplines of pharmacokinetics and pharmacodynamics. It integrates a pharmacokinetic and a pharmacodynamic model component into one set of mathematical expressions that allows the description of the time course of effect intensity in response to administration of a drug dose. PK/PD modeling is related to the field of pharmacometrics.

Central to PK/PD models is the concentration-effect or exposure-response relationship. A variety of PK/PD modeling approaches exist to describe exposure-response relationships. PK/PD relationships can be described by simple equations such as linear model, Emax model  or sigmoid Emax model. However, if a delay is observed between the drug administration and the drug effect, a temporal dissociation needs to be taken into account and more complex models exist:
 Direct vs Indirect link PK/PD models
 Direct vs Indirect response PK/PD models
Time variant vs time invariant
 Cell lifespan models
 Complex response models
PK/PD modeling has its importance at each step of the drug development and it has shown its usefulness in many diseases. The Food and Drug Administration also provides guidances for Industry to recommend how exposure-response studies should be performed.

References

Pharmacodynamics
Pharmacokinetics